Events from the year 1621 in literature.

Events
January 27 – Sir Francis Bacon is created Viscount St Alban.
February 3 – John Chamberlain writes to Sir Dudley Carleton telling him the anonymous author of the tract Vox Populi has been revealed to be  the radical preacher Thomas Scott. 
May 3 – Sir Francis Bacon is imprisoned in the Tower of London after being convicted of receiving bribes, but pardoned by King James I later in the year.
August 26 – Barten Holyday's allegorical play Technogamia, originally produced at Christ Church, Oxford in 1618, is staged before James I at Woodstock Palace. He dislikes it, but is persuaded to stay to the end for the student actors' sakes.
September 24 – The earliest known copy of the Corante, generally regarded as the first English newspaper, is published.
November 22 – The English poet John Donne is installed as Dean of St Paul's Cathedral in London.
December 30 – The Spanish writer Francisco de Borja y Aragón is replaced as Viceroy of Peru by Juan Jiménez de Montalvo, and embarks for home on the following day.

Uncertain date
Jeremias Drexel gives up preaching in order to write a biography of Elisabeth of Lorraine.

New books

Prose
William Alabaster – De bestia Apocalypsis
Robert Burton – The Anatomy of Melancholy
Méric Casaubon – Pietas contra maledicos patrii Nominis et Religionis Hostes
Mao Yuanyi (茅元儀, editor) – Wubei Zhi (武備志, Treatise on Armaments)
John Reynolds – The triumphs of Gods revenge, against the crying, and execrable sinne of murther
Rachel Speght – Mortalities Memorandum
John Taylor – Taylor's Motto
John Widdowes – A Description of the World
Lady Mary Wroth – The Countess of Montgomery's Urania

Drama
Francis Beaumont, John Fletcher, & Philip Massinger – Thierry and Theodoret (published)
Thomas Dekker, John Ford, & William Rowley – The Witch of Edmonton
Ben Jonson – The Gypsies Metamorphosed
Tirso de Molina – El vergonzoso en palacio

Poetry

George Wither – Wither's Motto

Births
January 27 – Thomas Willis, English physician and natural philosopher (died 1675)
March 18 – Henry Teonge, English diarist and naval chaplain (died 1690)
March 31 – Andrew Marvell,  English poet (died 1678)
April 25 – Roger Boyle, 1st Earl of Orrery, Anglo-Irish dramatist (died 1679)
July 8 – Jean de La Fontaine, French author of fables (died 1695)
December 3 – Bohuslav Balbín, Czech Jesuit writer (died 1688)
December 14 (baptised) – Thomas Long, English writer and cleric (died 1707)
unknown date – Jane Cavendish, English poet and playwright (died 1669)
probable – Françoise Bertaut de Motteville, French memoirist (died 1689)
Possible year (1621 or 1622) – Richard Allestree, English scholar and cleric (died 1681)

Deaths
January 25 – François Pithou, French author and jurist (born 1543)
March 4 – Ana de Jesús, Spanish nun and writer (born 1545)
May 11 – Johann Arndt, German theologian (born 1555)
June – William Strachey, English eye-witness historian (born 1572)
August 3 – Guillaume du Vair, French writer (born 1556)
August 15 – John Barclay, Scottish writer (born 1582)
September 25 – Mary Sidney, English playwright and translator (born 1561)
October 7 or 8 – Antoine de Montchrestien, French adventurer and dramatist (born c. 1575)
December 4 – Andrew Willet, English polemicist and cleric (born 1562)
unknown date – Ludwig Hollonius, German dramatist (born c. 1570)

Notelist

References

 
Years of the 17th century in literature